Pia Gjellerup (born 22 August 1959) is a Danish politician representing the Social Democrats. She has been a Member of Parliament (Folketinget) since 8 September 1987 and has occupied three different cabinet positions: Justice Minister (25 January 1993 - 29 March 1993), Minister of Trade and Industry (23 March 1998 - 23 December 2000), and Finance Minister (21 December 2000 - 27 November 2001).

She is a solicitor by profession.

External links
Kvinfo profile

1959 births
Living people
Danish Finance Ministers
Danish Justice Ministers
Members of the Folketing
Social Democrats (Denmark) politicians
Women members of the Folketing
Female justice ministers
Women government ministers of Denmark
Female finance ministers